Subba Riddhi Bahadur Malla (1898–1968) was a Nepali writer.

Malla was born on 8 December 1898 in Benaras, British India. His sons, Govinda Bahadur Malla and Bijaya Malla are also renowned writers. He founded Sharada, a Nepali-language magazine during the Rana-era.

Works

See also 
 Bhawani Bhikshu
 Lekhnath Paudyal
 Laxmi Prasad Devkota

References 

1898 births
1968 deaths
Nepali-language writers
19th-century Nepalese writers
20th-century Nepalese writers